Mark Joshua Gordon (May 19, 1926 – August 12, 2010) was an American film, television, theatre actor and theatre director.

Life and career 
Gordon was born in New York. He began his career in 1952, appearing in the Broadway play Desire Under the Elms.

Gordon made his television debut in 1956, playing Lt. Paul Carey in the soap opera The Edge of Night.

From the 1960s through the 1980s Gordon appeared in film and television programs including Take the Money and Run, Hawaii Five-O, The Mary Tyler Moore Show, A New Leaf, Don't Drink the Water, The F.B.I., Hawkins, Starsky & Hutch, The New Dick Van Dyke Show, Lotsa Luck, The Nickel Ride, Kojak and Hawkins. He also appeared in stage productions including Of Mice and Men, The Sign in Sidney Brustein's Window, and The Moon Besieged.

In 2001, Gordon retired, last appearing in the television series Ed, playing Hank Rodulescu.

Death 
Gordon died in August 2010 of lung cancer in New York, at the age of 84.

Filmography

Film

Television

References

External links 

1926 births
2010 deaths
Male actors from New York (state)
Deaths from lung cancer in New York (state)
American male film actors
American male television actors
20th-century American male actors
American theatre directors